Recreation Park  may refer to:

Canada
Recreation Park (Ontario), a classification of Ontario provincial parks
Recreation Park (Vancouver), a former baseball park; until 1913 the home of a team owned by Bob Brown

Scotland
Recreation Park, Alloa, a football ground
Recreation Park, Lochgelly, a former football ground
Recreation Park, a former football ground in Peterhead, former home of Peterhead F.C.

United States
Alphabetical by state, then city

City parks
Recreation Park (El Segundo), California
Recreation Park (Long Beach, California)
Recreation Park (Raymore), Missouri
Recreation Park (Binghamton), New York
Recreation Park Complex (Chehalis, Washington)

Baseball parks
Recreation Park (San Francisco), California, several former baseball parks
Recreation Park (Visalia), California, now Valley Strong Ballpark
Recreation Park (Detroit), Michigan (defunct)
Recreation Park (Columbus), Ohio (defunct)
Recreation Park (Philadelphia), Pennsylvania (defunct)
Recreation Park (Pittsburgh), Pennsylvania (defunct)